Tactical urbanism, also commonly referred to as guerrilla urbanism, pop-up urbanism, city repair, D.I.Y. urbanism, planning-by-doing, urban acupuncture, and urban prototyping, is a low-cost, temporary change to the built environment, usually in cities, intended to improve local neighbourhoods and city gathering places. 

Tactical urbanism is often citizen-led but can also be initiated by government entities. Community-led temporary installations are often intended to pressure government agencies into installing a more permanent or expensive version of the improvement.

Terminology

The term was popularized around 2010 to refer to a range of existing techniques. The Street Plans Collaborative defines "tactical urbanism" as an approach to urban change that features the following five characteristics: 
 A deliberate, phased approach to instigating change;
 The offering of local solutions for local planning challenges;
 Short-term commitment as a first step towards longer-term change;
 Lower-risk, with potentially high rewards; and
 The development of social capital between citizens and the building of organizational capacity between public and private institutions, non-profits, and their constituents.

While the 1984 English translation of The Practice of Everyday Life by French author Michel de Certeau used the term tactical urbanism, this was in reference to events occurring in Paris in 1968; the "tactical urbanism" that Certeau described was in opposition to "strategic urbanism", which modern concepts of tactical urbanism tend not to distinguish. The modern sense of the term is attributed to New York-based urban planner Mike Lydon. 

The Project for Public Spaces uses the phrase "Lighter, Quicker, Cheaper", coined by urban designer Eric Reynolds, to describe the same basic approach expressed by tactical urbanism.

Origin

The tactical urbanist movement takes inspiration from urban experiments including Ciclovía, Paris-Plages, and the introduction of plazas and pedestrian malls in New York City during the tenure of Janette Sadik-Khan as Commissioner of the New York City Department of Transportation.

Tactical urbanism formally emerged as a movement following a meeting of the Next Generation of New Urbanist (CNU NextGen) group in November 2010 in New Orleans. A driving force of the movement is to put the onus back on individuals to take personal responsibility in creating sustainable buildings, streets, neighborhoods, and cities. Following the meeting, an open-source project called Tactical Urbanism: Short TermAction | Long Term Change was developed by a group from NextGen to define tactical urbanism and to promote various interventions to improve urban design and promote positive change in neighbourhoods and communities.

Types of interventions 

 
Tactical urbanism projects vary significantly in scope, size, budget, and support. Projects often begin as grassroots interventions and spread to other cities, and are in some cases later adopted by municipal governments as best practices. Some common interventions are listed below:

Better block initiativesTemporarily transforming retail streets using cheap or donated materials and volunteers. Spaces are transformed by introducing food carts,  sidewalk tables, temporary bike lanes and narrowing of streets.
Chair bombingThe act of removing salvageable materials and using it to build public seating. The chairs are placed in areas that either are quiet or lack comfortable places to sit.
Crosswalk painting Guerrilla crosswalks are zebra crossings painted by the community on roadways and at intersections where the city government has failed to provide a marked pedestrian crossing.
De-fencingThe act of removing unnecessary fences to break down barriers between neighbours, beautify communities, and encourage community building.
DepavingThe act of removing unnecessary pavement to transform driveways and parking into green space so that rainwater can be absorbed and neighbourhoods beautified.
Food carts/trucksFood carts and trucks are used to attract people to underused public spaces and offer small business opportunities for entrepreneurs.
Guerrilla gardening Cultivating land that the gardeners do not have the legal rights to utilize, such as abandoned sites, areas not being cared for, or private property.
Open Streets To temporarily provide safe spaces for walking, bicycling, skating, and social activities; promote local economic development; and raise awareness about the impact of cars in urban spaces. "Open Streets" is an anglicized term for the South American 'Ciclovia', which originated in Bogota.
PARK(ing) DayAn annual event where on street parking is converted into park-like spaces. Park(ing) Day was launched in 2005 by Rebar art and design studio.
Pavement to Plazas Popularized in New York City, pavement plazas involve converting space on streets to usable public space. The closure of Times Square to vehicular traffic, and its low-cost conversion to a pedestrian plaza, is a primary example of a pavement plaza.
Pop-up cafesTemporary patios or terraces built in parking spots to provide overflow seating for a nearby cafe or for passersby. Most common in cities where sidewalks are narrow and where there otherwise is not room for outdoor sitting or eating areas.
Pop-up parksTemporary or permanent transformations of underused spaces into community gathering areas through beautification.
Pop-up retailTemporary retail stores that are set up in vacant stores or property.
Protected bike lanes Pop-up bicycle lanes are usually done by placing potted plants or other physical barriers to make painted bike lanes feel safer. Sometimes there is no pre-existing bike lane, and the physical protection is the only delineator.

Resources
The Street Plans Collaborative, in collaboration with Ciudad Emergente and Codesign studio, produces a series of free tactical urbanism e-books. Volumes 1 and 2 focus on North American case studies, Volume 3 is a Spanish-language guide to Latin American projects, and Volume 4 covers Australia and New Zealand, including responses to the 2011 Christchurch earthquake.

Street Plans' Mike Lydon and Anthony Garcia published a tactical urbanism book in March 2015.

See also
 Sneckdown
 Street reclamation

References

New Urbanism
Urban design
Environmentalism
Sustainable transport
Sustainable urban planning
Urban planning
Urban studies and planning terminology